Dubovac Castle is a castle in Karlovac, Croatia.

The Dubovac Castle overlooks the Croatian city Karlovac. Its square tower was probably built during the 13th century. In the 15th century, the castle was rebuilt in Renaissance style. The castle had various owners—from Slavonian nobleman family Sudar to famous Croatian counts and dukes Frankopan and Zrinski. From 1671 until 1809, the Dubovac was owned by the Karlovac generals. In 1837, a new owner, Count Laval Nugent, rebuilt the castle in the spirit of romanticism. Dubovac was once again renovated in 1952 in relation to graphics from the end of the 18th century." There is a photograph of the castle at that site.

The castle was used for several years recently as a hotel, and the damage done to the interior to accommodate rooms is now being repaired. There are museum exhibits and a large model of the countryside.  Guide materials indicate that the fortress was built on a hill constructed by the people in order to maximize defenses and views of the surrounding areas.

The castle recently was featured on a commemorative Croatian postage stamp, complete with photograph.

Gallery

References

External links
 Stamp HR028.04 http://www.wnsstamps.ch/stamps/HR028.04/en.html

Castles in Croatia
Karlovac
Buildings and structures in Karlovac County